Jahangiri Rural District is a rural district (dehestan) in the Central District of Masjed Soleyman County, Khuzestan Province, Iran. At the 2006 census, its population was 3,981, in 797 families.  The rural district has 78 villages.

References 

Rural Districts of Khuzestan Province
Masjed Soleyman County